Hueste (in Spanish), hoste (in Portuguese/Galician), host (in Catalan) or ost (in French) was the designation, used in the Iberian Peninsula and France, during the Middle Ages, to refer to a group of armed men under the command of a prelado or rico-hombre, with the objective of executing expeditions or warfare. Huestes were initially drawn from the broader population, but later became more selective as combat skills became more specialized.

Etymology
The terms, in the several Iberian languages, come from the Latin hoste or hostis, meaning "the enemy". 

At the start of the Middle Ages, there was no term in the Iberian Peninsula to signify a group of men with military objectives. The Castilian term hueste appeared in the Siete Partidas of the 13th century, with a meaning similar to the modern Castilian word tropas ("troops").

External links
Las huestes at Geocities 
Military history of Spain